Tammet may refer to:

Alexei Tammet-Romanov
Daniel Tammet (born 1979)
Tanel Tammet (born 1965)

Estonian-language surnames